Virginia's 80th House of Delegates district elects one of 100 seats in the Virginia House of Delegates, the lower house of the state's bicameral legislature. Located in southern, coastal Virginia, District 80 represents parts of the cities of Chesapeake, Norfolk, Portsmouth, and Suffolk. The seat is currently held by Democrat Don Scott.

District officeholders

References

Chesapeake, Virginia
Norfolk, Virginia
Portsmouth, Virginia
Suffolk, Virginia
Virginia House of Delegates districts